The Rev. Canon John Douglas Paul , was an eminent Anglican priest in the second half of the 20th century.

Life
He was born on 13 September 1928, educated at Winchester College and the University of Edinburgh and ordained in 1954. He was  Curate at The Ascension, Portsmouth and was then a  missionary in  Mozambique for over 20 years, finally becoming Archdeacon of  the country. After this he held incumbencies at Castle Douglas, Portobello and Elgin. He was Dean of Moray, Ross and Caithness from 1991 to 1992.  He died on 23 September 2009.

Notes

1928 births
People educated at Winchester College
Alumni of the University of Edinburgh
Deans of Moray, Ross and Caithness
2009 deaths